Sir George Barne (c. 1532–1593) was a prominent merchant and public official from London during the reign of Elizabeth I, and the son of Sir George Barne (died 1558) and Alice Brooke.

Life
Barne, a haberdasher of London, was an Alderman of the London ward Bridge between 1574 and 1576, Tower between 1576 and 1583, Langbourn between 1583 and 1587, and Bassishaw between 1587 and 1593. Barne served as Auditor of London in 1574, Sheriff of London between 1576 and 1577, Lord Mayor of London between 1586 and 1587, and was knighted by Lord Chamberlain in 1587. He was a Master of the Haberdashers' Company between 1586 and 1587, represented London in the Parliament between 1588 and 1589, and was President of St. Thomas' Hospital between 1592 and 1593. Barne was also the Governor of the Muscovy Company several times, and a founder of the Spanish Company, in 1577, and the Turkey Company.

In 1580, he helped finance a voyage to discover a Northeast Passage, as his father had done decades previously. Barne supported the voyage of Edward Fenton in 1582 and John Davis's voyage in 1586, both of which sought to find the Northwest Passage.

He was related to several families of the London oligarchy, had shares in the Company of Mineral and Battery Works, and was well connected, considered one of the most influential people of his times in London municipal affairs. Sir Jerome Horsey wrote that Barne was his dear friend, and it is noted that Barne was a contemporary of Henry Hudson.

John Stow dedicated his work "The Chronicles of England" to Barne.

Upon his death, Barne left a will which revealed his financial success, holding land and estates in several countries. He lived on Lombard Street, London and was buried at St Edmund, King and Martyr nearby.

Anti-Catholicism
He was noted for his excessive zeal against Catholics when he was the sheriff, resulting in a breach of diplomatic etiquette when he stormed a private residence hosting the Portuguese ambassador for mass. As a result, he was imprisoned in the Fleet for a few days. It is noted that he was the brother-in-law of Queen Elizabeth I's Secretary of State, Sir Francis Walsingham, who was responsible for breaking up the Catholic plot to overthrow the Queen during the following decade.

Marriage and issue
Barne married Anne Gerrard, daughter of Sir William Garrard, who was Lord Mayor of London in 1555. They had nine children:

 Sir William Barne, who married Anne, daughter of Dr. Edwin Sandys, Archbishop of York
 George Barne
 Francis Barne
 Thomas Barne
 John Barne
 Mark Barne
 Peter Barne
 Richard Barne, who married (as her second husband) Elizabeth, daughter of Sir Francis Aungier, 1st Baron Aungier of Longford by his first wife
 Anne Barne, who married (as his second wife) Sir Francis Aungier, 1st Baron Aungier of Longford

References

1530s births
1593 deaths

Year of birth uncertain
Sheriffs of the City of London
16th-century lord mayors of London
English MPs 1589
Merchants from London
English knights
16th-century merchants
People of the Muscovy Company
Levant Company
Members of the Parliament of England for the City of London
16th-century English businesspeople